Mytishchi is a city and the administrative center of Mytishchinsky District in Moscow Oblast, Russia, which lies 19 km northeast of Russia's capital Moscow on the Yauza River and the Moscow–Yaroslavl railway. The city was an important waypoint for traders on the Yauza River, the Yaroslavl Highway passes through the city. Mytishchi is famous for its aqueduct, built in 1804, the first water supply pipeline to supply the growing population of Moscow.

Climate
Mytishchi has a humid continental climate, which is the same as Moscow but usually a few degrees colder due to significantly lesser impact of urban heat island.

History
The first settlement of ancient hunters and fishermen in this location dates back to the 6th–8th millennia BCE, i.e., in the late Stone Age. In the 8th–9th centuries, first Slavic tribes (Vyatichi and Krivichs) began settling here. In and around Mytishchinsky District about a dozen of such settlements from the 11th–13th centuries have been discovered.

The modern settlement has been known as the village Mystiche since 1460, and Bolshiye Mytishchi since the 19th century. The name comes from the so-called mytnaya (or "myta") duty that was levied on merchants hauling ships (by wheels, rollers or skids) between the Yauza and Klyazma Rivers, collected at the place now known as Yauza mytishche. The word "Mytische" is a portmanteau of myt (а) and a place where there was a residential building with a kiln and a hearth.

In 1804, the Mytishchi-Moscow aqueduct was built by order of Catherine the Great. It was the first water supply constructed in Russia to provide the Kremlin with pure water.

The first enterprises were organized in Mytischi in the middle of the 19th Century. Mytischi station, on the Moscow-Yaroslavl railway, opened in 1861, SI Mamontov's car building plant opened in 1896, and Viskova, Russia's first artificial silk company, began work in 1908. Mytischi and its district became a popular summer retreat for Russian holidaymakers from the late 19th and early 20th centuries, .

Mytischi gained city status on August 17, 1925.

In 1932, the territory of the city was significantly expanded, according to the decree of the Presidium of the Moscow Regional Executive Committee No. 8 (minutes No. 56) of October 4, 1932 and the decree of the Presidium of the All-Russian Central Executive Committee of November 20, 1932 that approved it. The settlement merged with the villages of Bolshie Mytishchi, Rupasovo, Sharapovo, Zarechnaya Sloboda, Leonidovka, Perlovka, Taininsky settlements, Druzhba and Taininka.

Population

Mytishchi is the fourth largest city in Moscow Oblast after Balashikha, Podolsk, Khimki in terms of population.

Administrative and municipal status
Within the framework of administrative divisions, Mytishchi serves as the administrative center of Mytishchinsky District. As an administrative division, it is, together with twenty-four rural localities, incorporated within Mytishchinsky District as the Town of Mytishchi. As a municipal division, the Town of Mytishchi is incorporated within Mytishchinsky Municipal District as Mytishchi Urban Settlement.

Economy

The city is the oblast's largest center for industry (machine building, arms industry in particular) and education. The Mytishchi Machine-Building Plant and Metrovagonmash (a manufacturer of train cars) are two large employers.

Architecture

Cultural heritage sites 
The city has a number of cultural heritage sites

 Settlement "Mytishchi-1" (a monument of archeology of the XV-XVIII centuries) - Yaroslavl highway, 60–88, 61–91.
 The complex of buildings of the Mytishchi car-building plant (part of the Metrovagonmash plant (MMZ)) (late 19th - early 20th century).
 Two dachas in the dacha village of Perlovka : a wooden dacha of the Ageev merchants (architectural monument, 1900s) - Pionerskaya st., 10.
 The Mytishchi pumping station (part of Catherine the Great's Mytishchi water pipeline) in the Losiny Ostrov National Park.
 Church of the Vladimir Icon of the Mother of God (architectural monument, 1713) - Yaroslavskoe shosse, 93.
 Church of the Annunciation in Taininsky (architectural monument, 1675–1677).
 Church of the Don Icon of the Mother of God in Perlovka.

In 2005, the Church of the Nativity of Christ was built in the city center. On the central square, there are 4 lanterns of the late 1950s, presumably the project of M. A. Minkus. Identical lights were installed at the lobby o fhte Kropotkinskaya metro station (Prechistenka St.) and at the Nikulin Moscow Circus on Tsvetnoy Boulevard.

Monuments 

 Monuments to Vladimir Lenin
 Monument "Bayonet" in honor of the victory in the Great Patriotic War
 Memorial of the Great Patriotic War
 Monument to the partisan V. D. Voloshina
 Monument to the pilots of the Mytishchi flying club (an exact copy of the U-2 [Po-2] aircraft). Artist-architect Valery Androsov
 Monument to the Hero of the Soviet Union pilot N. M. Raspopova
 Monument to cosmonaut G. M. Strekalov
 Monument to A. V. Suvorov
 SU-76M
 ZSU-23-4 "Shilka" (a monument to the designer N. A. Astrov, 1906–1992)
 Monument to V. M. Kolontsov (1888-1920), the commander of the Red Guard detachment, who died during the Civil War in battles with the White Guards, the central street of old Mytishchi, Kolontsova Street, is named after him
 Monument to D. M. Kedrin
 Monument to the Mytishchi water pipeline
 Monument to the ancient portage that existed on the site of the modern city (wooden sculpture "Ladya" near the Central Park of Culture and Culture of Mytishchi )
 Monument to the employees of the Mytishchi police, participants of the Great Patriotic War
 Monument to military signalmen
 Monument to the citizens of Mytishchi who died in the line of military and official duty and in local conflicts
 Sculpture "A cat without a tail" from the sister city of Gabrovo
 Monument to Olya Lukoya at the puppet theater "Ognivo"
 Monument to the Family, love and fidelity
 Monument to Nicholas II
 Monument to the subway car
 Monument to the samovar
 Monument to General Pyotr Deinekin at the Federal War Memorial Cemetery . Opened in August 2018

Twin towns – sister cities

Mytishchi is twinned with:

 Angarsk, Russia
 Bakhchysarai, Ukraine
 Baranovichi, Belarus
 Barysaw, Belarus

 Düren (district), Germany
 Gabrovo, Bulgaria
 Lecco, Italy
 Smalyavichy, Belarus
 Zhodzina, Belarus

Former twin towns:
 Panevėžys, Lithuania
 Płock, Poland

In March 2022, Panevėžys and Płock suspended their partnerships with Mytishchi as a response to the 2022 Russian invasion of Ukraine.

Culture

Mass Media
There are three local TV channels: "Our Mytishchi" - the channel that belongs to the town, "The first Mytishchinsky", and "TV Mytishchi" (on the TV channel of Moscow region 360°) - district television.

Theatres
There is Ognivo puppet theatre, FEST drama and comedy theatre, and youth theater Domoy (Homewards).

Notable people
People born in Mytishchi:
Mikhail Egorovich Alekseev (1949-2014), linguist
Yuri Bezmenov (1939-1993), journalist
Ivan Dmitriyevich Borisov (1913-1939), pilot
Yevgeny Dietrich (born 1973), politician
Vadim Evseev (born 1976), football coach
Anna Frolova (born 2005), figure skater
Alexey Glyzin (born 1954), actor
Tatyana Golikova (born 1966), politician
Elizaveta Khudaiberdieva (born 2002), ice dancer
Evgeny Kirillov (born 1987), tennis player
Yelena Kondakova (born 1957), cosmonaut
Pavel Maykov (born 1975), actor
Dmitry Miller (born 1972), actor
Svetlana Moskalets (born 1969), heptathlete
Alexander Pichushkin (born 1974), serial killer
Stanislav Pozhlakov (1937-2003), musician
Mikhail Semichastny (1910-1978), football player
Artyom Serikov (born 2000), ice hockey player
Roman Sharonov (born 1976), football coach
Gennady Strekalov (1940-2004), cosmonaut
Viktoria Vasilieva (born 2003), figure skater
Aleksei Yeroshkin (born 1987), football player

References

Notes

Sources

External links
Official website of Mytishchi 
Unofficial website of Mytishchi  

Cities and towns in Moscow Oblast
Mytishchinsky District